In modern parlance, a colony is a territory subject to a form of foreign rule. Though dominated by the foreign colonizers, colonies remain separate from the administration of the original country of the colonizers, the metropolitan state (or "mother country"). This administrative colonial separation makes colonies neither incorporated territories nor client states. Some colonies have been organized either as dependent territories that are not sufficiently self-governed, or as self-governed colonies controlled by colonial settlers.

The term colony originates from the ancient Roman colonia, a type of Roman settlement. Derived from colon-us (farmer, cultivator, planter, or settler), it carries with it the sense of 'farm' and 'landed estate'.
Furthermore the term was used to refer to the older Greek apoikia, which were overseas settlements by ancient Greek city-states. The city that founded such a settlement became known as its metropolis ("mother-city").

Since early-modern times, historians, administrators, and political scientists have generally used the term "colony" to refer mainly to the many different overseas territories of particularly European states between the 15th and 20th centuries CE, with colonialism and decolonization as corresponding phenomena. While colonies often developed from trading outposts or territorial claims, such areas do not need to be a product of colonization, nor become colonially organized territories.

Some historians use the term informal colony to refer to a country under the de facto control of another state, although this term is often contentious.

Etymology

The word "colony" comes from the Latin word , used as concept for Roman military bases and eventually cities. This in turn derives from the word , which was a Roman tenant farmer.

The terminology is taken from architectural analogy, where a column pillar is beneath the (often stylized) head capital, which is also a biological analog of the body as subservient beneath the controlling head (with 'capital' coming from the Latin word , meaning 'head'). So colonies are not independently self-controlled, but rather are controlled by a separate entity that serves the capital function.

Roman colonies first appeared when the Romans conquered neighbouring Italic peoples. These were small farming settlements that appeared when the Romans had subdued an enemy in war. Though a colony could take many forms, such as a trade outpost or a military base in enemy territory, such has not been inherently colonies. Its original definition as a settlement created by people migrating from a central region to an outlying one became the modern definition.

Settlements that began as Roman colonia include cities from Cologne (which retains this history in its name), Belgrade to York. A tell-tale sign of a settlement within the Roman sphere of influence once being a Roman colony is a city centre with a grid pattern.

Ancient examples

 Carthage formed as a Phoenician colony
 Cadiz formed as a Phoenician colony
 Cyrene was a colony of the Greeks of Thera
 Sicily was a Phoenician colony
 Sardinia was a Phoenician colony
 Marseille formed as a Greek colony
 Malta was a Phoenician colony
 Cologne formed as a Roman colony and its modern name refer to the Latin term "Colonia".
 Kandahar formed as a Greek colony during the Hellenistic era by Alexander the Great in 330 BC.

Modern historical examples

 : a colony of Portugal from the 16th century to its independence in 1975.
  gained its independence from Spain in 1810.
  was formed as a British Dominion in 1901 from a federation of six distinct British colonies which were founded between 1788 and 1829.
 : was a colony of Great Britain important in the Atlantic slave trade. It gained its independence in 1966.
 : a colony of Portugal since the 16th century. Independent since 1822.
 : was colonized first by France as New France (1534–1763) and England (in Newfoundland, 1582) then under British rule (1763–1867), before achieving Dominion status and losing "colony" designation. 
 : a colony of Belgium from 1908 to 1960; previously under private ownership of King Leopold II.

 was an Italian colony from 1935 to 1941. Sovereignty has been reestablished after a British protectorate status in 1947. 
  was formed in October 1887 from Annam, Tonkin, Cochinchina (which together form modern Vietnam) and the Kingdom of Cambodia; Laos was added after the Franco-Siamese War in 1893. The federation lasted until 1954. In the four protectorates, the French formally left the local rulers in power, who were the Emperors of Vietnam, Kings of Cambodia, and Kings of Luang Prabang, but gathered all powers in their hands, the local rulers acting only as figureheads.
 : Contact between Europe and Ghana (known as the Gold Coast) began in the 15th century with the arrival of the Portuguese. This soon led to the establishment of several colonies by European powers: Portuguese Gold Coast (1482–1642), Dutch Gold Coast (1598–1872), Swedish Gold Coast (1650–1663), Danish Gold Coast (1658–1850), Brandenburger and Prussian Gold Coast (1685–1721) and British Gold Coast (1821–1957). In 1957, Ghana was the first African colony south of the Sahara to become independent.
  was a colony of Denmark-Norway from 1721 and was a colony of Denmark from 1814 to 1953. In 1953 Greenland was made an equal part of the Danish Kingdom. Home rule was granted in 1979 and extended to self-rule in 2009. See also Danish colonization of the Americas.
 : a colony of Portugal since the 15th century. Independent since 1974.
  was a British colony (from 1983 British Dependent Territory) from 1841 to 1997. Is now a Special Administrative Region of China.
  India was an imperial political entity comprising present-day India, Bangladesh, and Pakistan with regions under the direct control of the British Government of the United Kingdom from 1858 to 1947. From the 15th century until 1961, Portuguese India (Goa) was a colony of Portugal. Pondicherry and Chandernagore were part of French India from 1759 to 1954. Small Danish colonies of Tharangambadi, Serampore and the Nicobar Islands) from 1620 to 1869 were known as Danish India.
  was a Dutch colony which differs in each region, but gain full independence as a whole nation in 1949.
  was part of the Spanish West Indies in the sixteenth and seventeenth centuries. It became an English colony in 1655 and; independence in 1962.
  a colony set up in 1821 by American private citizens for the migration of African American freedmen. Liberian Declaration of Independence from the American Colonization Society on 26 July 1847. It is the second oldest black republic in the world after Haiti. 
  was a Portuguese colony (from 1976 a "Chinese territory under Portuguese administration") from 1557 to 1999. In 1999, two years after Hong Kong, it became a Special Administrative Region of China.
  was colonized initially by the Portuguese Empire and captures Malacca. After 1511, where the Portuguese Empire had colonized Malaysia, Britain establishes colonies and trading ports on Malay peninsula; Penang is leased to the British East India Company. The Dutch Empire encountered Malaysia when it was looking for spices to trade with.
  was a British protectorate and later a colony from the French Revolutionary Wars in 1800 to independence in 1964.
 : a colony of Portugal since the 15th century. Independent since 1975.
Achieved self-governing Commonwealth status in 1935; independent in 1946.
 was a colony of Spain from 1493 to 1898, when it passed to be a colonial possession of the United States, classified by the United States as "an unincorporated territory". In 1914, the Puerto Rican House of Delegates voted unanimously in favor of independence from the United States, but this was rejected by the U.S. Congress as "unconstitutional" and in violation of the U.S. 1900 Foraker Act. In 1952, after the US Congress approved Puerto Rico's constitution, its formal name became "Commonwealth of Puerto Rico", but its new name "did not change Puerto Rico's political, social, and economic relationship to the United States." That year, the United States advised the United Nations (UN) that the island was a self-governing territory. The United States has been "unwilling to play in public the imperial role... it has no appetite for acknowledging in a public way the contradictions implicit in frankly colonial rule." The island has been called a colony by many, including US Federal judges, US Congresspeople, the Chief Justice of the Puerto Rico Supreme Court, and numerous scholars. 
  consisted of territories and colonies by various African and European powers, including the Dutch, the British, and the Nguni. The territory consisting of the modern nation was ruled directly by the British from 1806 to 1910; became a self-governing dominion of Union of South Africa in 1910.
 : a British colony from 1815 to 1948. Known as Ceylon. Was a British Dominion until 1972. Also a Portuguese colony in the 16th–17th centuries, and a Dutch colony in the 17th–18th centuries.
 was a colony of Japan from 1910 to 1945. North and South Korea were established in 1948. 
  has a complex history of colonial rule under various powers, including the Dutch (1624–1662), Spanish (1626–1642), Chinese (1683–1895), and Japanese (1895–1945). The precolonial (pre-1624) inhabitants of Taiwan are the ethno-linguistically Austronesian Taiwanese indigenous peoples, rather than the vast majority of present-day Taiwanese people, who are mostly ethno-linguistically Han Chinese. Twice throughout history, Taiwan has served as a quasi rump state for Chinese governments, the first instance being the Ming-loyalist Kingdom of Tungning (1662–1683) and the second instance being the present-day Republic of China (ROC), which officially claims continuity or succession from the Republic of China (1912–1949), having retreated from mainland China to Taiwan in 1949 during the final years of the Chinese Civil War (1927–1949). The ROC, whose de facto territory consists almost entirely of the island of Taiwan and its minor satellite islands, continues to rule Taiwan as if it were a separate country from the People's Republic of China (consisting of mainland China, Hong Kong, and Macau).
 The  was formed from a union of thirteen British colonies. The Colony of Virginia was the first of the thirteen colonies. All thirteen declared independence in July 1776 and expelled the British governors.

Current colonies

The Special Committee on Decolonization maintains the United Nations list of non-self-governing territories, which identifies areas the United Nations (though not without controversy) believes are colonies. Given that dependent territories have varying degrees of autonomy and political power in the affairs of the controlling state, there is disagreement over the classification of "colony".

See also
 Colonialism
 Colonization
 Decolonization
 Democracy Peace Theory
 Exploitation colonialism
 Scramble for Africa
 Settler colonialism
 United Nations list of non-self-governing territories
 Development town
 Spice Trade

Notes

References

Further reading
 Aldrich, Robert. Greater France: A History of French Overseas Expansion (1996)
 Ansprenger, Franz ed. The Dissolution of the Colonial Empires (1989)
 Benjamin, Thomas, ed. Encyclopedia of Western Colonialism Since 1450 (2006).
 Ermatinger, James. ed. The Roman Empire: A Historical Encyclopedia (2 vol 2018)
 Higham, C. S. S. History Of The British Empire (1921) online free
 James, Lawrence. The Illustrated Rise and Fall of the British Empire (2000)
 Kia, Mehrdad, ed. The Ottoman Empire: A Historical Encyclopedia (2017)
 Page, Melvin E. ed. Colonialism: An International Social, Cultural, and Political Encyclopedia (3 vol. 2003)
 Priestley, Herbert Ingram. (France overseas;: A study of modern imperialism 1938) 463pp; encyclopedic coverage as of late 1930s
 Tarver, H. Micheal and Emily Slape. The Spanish Empire: A Historical Encyclopedia (2 vol. 2016)
 Wesseling, H.L. The European Colonial Empires: 1815–1919 (2015).

External links

 Non-Self-Governing Territories Listed by the United Nations General Assembly in 2002
 Non-Self-Governing Territories Listed by the United Nations General Assembly in 2012
 Siberia : History (covers Siberia as Russian colony)

Types of administrative division
 
Articles containing video clips